Aveyond is a role-playing video game series by Aveyond Studios (formerly Amaranth Games or Aveyond Kingdom). It is set in a fantasy medieval world in which players attempt to save the world from evil beings, with a number of side quests available. There are eight games thus far in the series: the first two full games, the four "chapter" releases of the third game, the full fourth game, and the free prequel, Ahriman's Prophecy.  All the games in the series were made with RPG Maker XP;  Several of the games were subsequently released for Linux and Mac, along with Windows.

Ahriman's Prophecy
Ahriman's Prophecy is a freeware role-playing video game released in 2004, and is the prequel of the series. Borrowing  elements from Dragon Warrior and the earlier Final Fantasy games for its gameplay, it offers an experience similar to Japanese role-playing games.
Unlike the other titles in the Aveyond series, Ahriman's Prophecy was not developed with RPG Maker XP and instead was created with RPG Maker 2003.

Ahriman's Prophecy starts as a young girl, Talia Maurva, is sent to be "named", a ritual set up by the people of her village to determine the profession of their adult life. Destiny changes for Talia, who, when looking into the seer's pool, sees a dark ceremony by the younger prince of a nearby kingdom, Candar. He and his dark priest were attempting to resurrect the dead warlock emperor, Ahriman, whose history in battle and warfare is legendary. The seer, sensing that Talia is different, sends her and her escort to a school of magic in the mainland city of Thais. Devin Perry, a friend of Talia, agrees to escort her to the mainland. Just after she completes her training three years later, Talia is summoned into a dream by her headmaster and a high priestess of the dreamland. They want her to slip across the continent to warn another order of priestesses that Ahriman is being resurrected, and the prophecy that surrounded his resurrection must be stopped before the thirteenth moon. Confused and disoriented, Talia nevertheless sets out on a journey that seems to pave the way to some peace in the world.

Reception
Ahriman's Prophecy was received well by the gaming community. Edward Zuk of Game Tunnel opined that "while Ahriman's Prophecy adds little that is new to the RPG genre, it's a pleasing mix of familiar elements." Download.com's editor's review stated "we found the game's twee period music a guilty pleasure that reminded us of our last visit to Ye Olde Renaissance Faire. And considering the game's free, you get a heck of a lot of adventuring for your money," awarding it a score of 4/5.

Aveyond: Rhen's Quest
The sequel to Ahriman's Prophecy, this game features a different map from its prequel except for two islands. The game has a wealth of quests, characters and endings, and has been considered to be "funny, innovative and wildly imaginative".

Plot
Devin Perry and Alicia Pendragon from Ahriman's Prophecy eventually married, as well as Talia and an unnamed Sun Priest. Sixteen years prior to Aveyond 1: Rhen's Quest, the forces of the demon Ahriman destroyed and sunk most of the surrounding areas and isles around Thais. This was because Alicia Pendragon, queen of Thais, was foretold to give birth to a child who would defeat a great demon and save the city if she reached adulthood. It was the foretelling of this birth that Ahriman wanted Thais destroyed. Tailor Darzon, a young but trusted general of Thais, offered to take the child to a safe place and raise her where the demon would not find her. As Thais and the queen fell, Tailor fled the kingdom with the child and escaped across the ocean to the Western Isle. He almost did not make it, but Talia Maurva, the Druid of Dreams, saved their lives. Tailor settled in the small mountain village of Clearwater.

When the game starts, the protagonist, Rhen, gets teleported to a part of the Dreamland. A priestess, barely alive after the daeva Agas attacked her, asks Rhen to bring her back through the portal to Clearwater. Rhen's many questions were only partially answered by the stranger. The priestess, Talia, gives Rhen her ring and tells her to keep it close, and that it will protect her. Unfortunately, before she knew more, a case of mistaken identity causes Rhen, instead of the priestess, to be kidnapped by a slave trader and she was sold to a family residing on the Eastern Isle, an ocean away from Clearwater. This slave trader was employed by Ahriman as part of a scheme with the sun priest Dameon Maurva, Talia's son. A long and bitter family history prompts Dameon to forsake his duty as the Druid of Light to serve Ahriman, as his father, the previous Druid of Light, had. When they found out about the slave trader's mistake, Ahriman had the Dark Seer, Indra, read Rhen's part in the apocalypse. He learns then that Rhen is destined to destroy him, but he can't kill her or he will also be destroyed. So, he sends his minions to find her and turn her to his side, as Indra proclaimed. Meanwhile, Rhen is found to have a great aptitude for sword magic when she defends a child from the bullying of her master's son. She is released from slavery and sent to the eastern capital city to learn the art of sword singing. After she was raised to an apprentice however, she reunites with the priestess, who was actually Talia, who tells her that she must reunite all eight druids of the world so that an artifact of great importance could be revealed, and that it was her destiny to finally vanquish Ahriman once and for all. Along her journey, Rhen will discover secrets about her past and will have to make decisions that will determine the direction of her future as well as the fate of the world.

Soundtrack
The game's soundtrack was written and recorded by Aaron Walz. The score features many recorded symphonic instruments, a rare feature for an independent game. The soundtrack won Game Tunnel's Game of the Year: Sound award for 2006.

Reception
Independent gaming website Game Tunnel awarded Aveyond their Game of the Month and Gold Award in March 2006. On the other side, Game Chronicles reviewer Jason Porter highlighted awkward key mapping (which cannot be remapped) and criticized the main character's personalities, dialogues and evolution throughout the game.

Platforms
Initially Windows-only, the game was released for Linux in June 2016 and subsequently for Mac.

Aveyond 2: Ean's Quest
Ean's Quest is a sequel to Ahriman's Prophecy and Aveyond. It includes a few returning characters from the previous games. Aaron Walz returned to produce the soundtrack to Aveyond 2.

Plot
Ean (a male changeling) and Iya (a female song mage) are two young elves who live in a far away place called the Vale. One day, Ean wakes up to find that Iya, his best friend, has gone missing.  Furthermore, none of the people of Vale remember who she is. Thus, Ean sets out on a quest to find his missing friend. On his quest, Ean will find that dear Iya has been swept away by the Snow Queen (who last appeared in Aveyond I: Rhen's Quest).  Ean must save his friend, and Iya must learn to control her wild powers that the Snow Queen desires for herself.  They must fight to stop the Snow Queen's plot to cover the world in ice.

Reception
Aveyond 2 received generally positive reviews by the gaming community. Erin Bell of Gamezebo said "it's a great example of a 'casual' role-playing game that delivers a delightful and accessible fantasy adventure." Neal Chandran from RPGFan said "Aveyond 2 represents another wonderful independently developed RPG and is another feather in the cap of Amaranth Games" and that though it does not revolutionize the Aveyond series in any way, it "adds another immersive entry to this solid series." Aveyond 2 was second runner-up in the 2007 Game Tunnel Game of the Year: Player's Choice Award and RPG of the Year Award.

Platforms
The game is available for Windows, Linux and Mac.

Aveyond 3: Orbs of Magic
Aveyond 3 is divided into four chapters, that is downloaded individually with a save game to be transferred from one game to the next. The games can also be played as a stand-alone, but that is not recommended and misses several key features this way. Orbs of Magic centers on Mel, a thief who steals a powerful heirloom. Unbeknownst to her, Mel is a descendant of Mordred Darkthrop, (an evil sorcerer who plotted to rule the world), and only a Darkthrop can remove the Orbs of Magic from their resting place. Accidentally handing the Orb of Darkness over to a megalomaniac vampire lord, she now has to run for her life and find a way to stop him from using the orb and destroying the light from the surface world.

Chapter 1: The Lord of Twilight

Plot
Chapter 1 was released on June 5, 2009. Mel, a thief who dwells in the town of Harburg is introduced as the protagonist in this chapter. She is hired by an unknown man to steal an heirloom is great importance. Later, the man reveals to be Gyendal, the chief antagonist, a vampire lord wanting to plunge the world into darkness. Rescued by a vampiress and sent to study in an academy in the city of Thais, Mel trains as a spy. As it is evident she can hide no longer, she sets out on a journey to the land of Naylith, where lie the answers to the puzzles. On her journey, Mel meets a prince, Edward, Stella, a gentle girl of mysterious origin and two classic characters from the first Aveyond, the Vampiress Te'ijal and her husband Galahad.

Chapter 2:  Gates of Night

Plot
Chapter 2 is a direct continuation of Chapter 1 and all items and spells are carried over. It continues the adventures to find the way to Naylith and have the final (or at least a final) confrontation with the Vampire Lord. Two more people join the party: Lydia, seen in Lord of Twilight, a powerful fighter with magical spells, and Ulf, an orcish scholar who you rescue from the orcish prison.

Chapter 3:  The Lost Orb

Plot
This game is not a direct continuation of the previous. All items are removed, as are several of the characters because they considered the quest to have ended in The Gates of Night. This chapter was released on February 15, 2010. There are three new party members: June, a spell trickster, Yvette, a familiar, and Spook, a thief with a dark secret. Things ended pretty good in Chapter 2 but now it seems that Lydia is up to no good. What should have been the most romantic day in Mel's life (if Edward proposed to her) turns into a nightmare. Having nothing left for her in Thais Mel sets out to find the fourth and final lost orb, to prevent it from being used and prevent The Darkthrop Prophecy from happening.

Chapter 4:  The Darkthrop Prophecy

Plot
This final game in the series was released on December 21, 2010. Mel has been living Harakauna for the last year after discovering that she had magic when she is finally found by the darklings that now know that she is the prophesied one. Before they can take her, she is rescued by Edward and two scholars from a land far away. (A land that hasn't been in the Aveyond series seen since Rhens quest). They offer her magical training at their academy but she only agrees to go if Edward will train with her. After arriving in Veldarah, she eventually accepts her magic and starts to love it. It all goes well until the attack. They came for her, but almost no one believes her. One unnamed professor wants to meet with her in a lone cabin far out in the woods, and Mel decides to check it out. When it is, unsurprisingly, a trap she is captured by her former nemesis, the former vampire lord. This game differs from the others in that there are two different parties, Mel's and Stella's. Players swap between them, but they never meet and merge. Players therefore have two completely different inventories.

The four chapters for the game are available for Windows, Linux and Mac.

Aveyond 4: Shadow of the Mist
Released on December 10, 2015, after five years of hiatus. The main character of this game is Boyle, a renounced villain who once set out to rule the world, but was defeated and forced to live in a small town. After series of mishaps, he now has to take up the path of a hero and try to save the world.

Plot
The main character, Boyle, resides in a town for retired villains, along with others like him. Ingrid, a witch in the town, has cursed him to marry her. In a series of events that lead him to losing his dog, he must now set out to save his beloved animal by carrying out the heroic task of saving the son of the Mist Queen. On the way, he comes across numerous characters with vividly different personalities who join him on his epic quest. In the end, Boyle successfully saves everyone and is a hero, almost.

Platforms
The game is available for Windows, Linux and Mac.

References

External links
Official website

2004 video games
Fantasy video games
Role-playing video games
RPG Maker games
Linux games
MacOS games
Video games developed in the United States
Video games featuring female protagonists
Video game franchises introduced in 2004
Windows games